Dario Grava (born February 11, 1948 in Claut, Province of Pordenone) is a French retired professional football defender.

External links

Profile on French federation official site
Profile

1948 births
Living people
People from the Province of Pordenone
French footballers
France international footballers
Association football defenders
RC Strasbourg Alsace players
OGC Nice players
Ligue 1 players
Ligue 2 players
Olympic footballers of France
Footballers at the 1968 Summer Olympics
Competitors at the 1967 Mediterranean Games
Mediterranean Games gold medalists for France
Italian emigrants to France
Mediterranean Games medalists in football
Italian footballers
Footballers from Friuli Venezia Giulia